Kaplan Medical Center (Merkaz Refu'i Kaplan) is a district general hospital in Rehovot, Israel, located in the south of the city next to Bilu Junction. It is owned and operated by Clalit Health Services.

History
Kaplan Medical Center is a teaching hospital affiliated with Hadassah and the Hebrew University of Jerusalem's Medical School. It also has a small branch in nearby Gedera, the Herzfeld Medical Center, which mainly serves as a geriatric hospital and nursing home.

In 2001, the hospital had 625 beds and in May 2007 was the tenth largest hospital in Israel. It was founded in 1953 and was named after Eliezer Kaplan, a well-known Zionist and the first Finance Minister of Israel.

See also
Health care in Israel
List of Israeli hospitals

References

External links
Official website 

Buildings and structures in Rehovot
Hospital buildings completed in 1953
Hospitals established in 1953
Hospitals in Israel
Yaakov Rechter buildings
1953 establishments in Israel